The 2008 NAIA Football Championship Series concluded on December 20, 2008 with the championship game played at Barron Stadium in Rome, Georgia.  The championship was won by the Sioux Falls Cougars over the Carroll Fighting Saints by a score of 23–7.

Tournament bracket

  * denotes OT.
  ** in their opening round game, Northwestern Oklahoma State used ineligible players.  The results of that game were left on the record books, but the Rangers were ruled ineligible for further participation in the championship series.  Their opponent in the second round, Carroll (MT), was automatically advanced to the next round.

References

NAIA Football National Championship
Sioux Falls Cougars football games
Carroll Fighting Saints football
NAIA Football National Championship
NAIA Football National Championship
NAIA Football National Championship